Erling Dávidsson Jacobsen (born 13 February 1990) is a Faroese international footballer who plays as a defender for Víkingur.

Career
Jacobsen has played club football in both Denmark and the Faroe Islands for Fremad Amager, GÍ Gøta, FC Amager and Vanløse IF. He had his debut on the Faroe Islands national football team in the 1-1 draw against Northern Ireland on 12 October 2010 on Svangaskarð Stadium. The Faroese newspaper Dimmalætting called Jacobsen "Man of the Match" in a headline in the following edition. In an internet article on their website, UEFA said in a subheadline two weeks after the draw against Northern Ireland "One to watch: Erling Jacobsen (Víkingur)".
Jacobsen has also played for all the youth national teams of the Faroe Islands: Faroe Islands U21, Faroe Islands U19, Faroe Islands U17 and for Faroe Islands U15. He played with the team which won the Aberdeen International Football Festival 2006 for Boys 16. Jacobsen also won the Boys 16 5-A-Side competition at the same festival together with three other Faroese football players.

Young Player of the Year
Every year after the end of the Faroese football season the Faroese newspaper Sosialurin arranges an award evening in order to honour the best Faroese football players and others. The categories are: Best Male Football Player, Best Female Football Player, Young Player of the Year (male and female), Goal Keeper of the Year, Coach of the Year and Judge of the Year. It is the captains and coaches of all the teams in the best Faroese football divisions for men and women who elect the best persons. Erling Jacobsen won the award "Young Player of the Year 2010".

References

External links

1990 births
Living people
Faroese footballers
Association football defenders
Fremad Amager players
GÍ Gøta players
Víkingur Gøta players
Vanløse IF players
Danish 1st Division players
Faroe Islands Premier League players
Faroe Islands youth international footballers
Faroe Islands under-21 international footballers
Faroe Islands international footballers
Faroese expatriate footballers
Expatriate men's footballers in Denmark